Barbara Slater may refer to:
Barbara Slater (actress) (1920–1997), American film actress
Barbara Slater (sports producer) (born 1959), sports producer and former gymnast